KCMX may refer to:

 KCMX (AM), a radio station (880 AM) licensed to Phoenix, Oregon, United States
 KCMX-FM, a radio station (101.9 FM) licensed to Ashland, Oregon, United States
 the ICAO code for Houghton County Memorial Airport